Morteza Izadi Zardalou born on August 21, 1981 is an Iranian footballer who plays for Shahrdari Arak in the Iranian Premier League.

Club career
Izadi started his career with Shahrdari Bandar Abbas and Steel Azin in the Azadegan League before moving to Saipa in 2009.

 Assist Goals

International
In 2003, Izadi Featured for Iran U-23 in their qualifying match in Japan.

References

1981 births
Living people
Iranian footballers
Saipa F.C. players
Naft Tehran F.C. players
Steel Azin F.C. players
Shahrdari Bandar Abbas players
Association football defenders
People from Sanandaj